Jörn Neumeister (born 7 May 1987) is a German former footballer who played as a centre-back for Borussia Dortmund II.

Career
Neumeister made his professional debut in the 3. Liga for Borussia Dortmund II on 21 August 2009, coming on as a substitute in the 64th minute for David Vržogić in the 1–0 away win against FC Ingolstadt.

References

External links
 Profile at DFB.de
 Profile at kicker.de

1987 births
Living people
Sportspeople from Münster
Footballers from North Rhine-Westphalia
German footballers
Association football central defenders
Borussia Dortmund II players
3. Liga players
Regionalliga players